The West Indies and Gulf Coast campaigns may refer to:

 The West Indies campaign of the Anglo-French War
 The Gulf Coast campaign of American Revolutionary War